Pseudopostega monosperma is a moth of the family Opostegidae. It was described by Edward Meyrick in 1931. It is known from Bahia, Brazil.

The length of the forewings is about 3.6 mm.

References

Opostegidae
Moths described in 1931